Events in the year 2018 in Slovakia.

Incumbents
 President – Andrej Kiska (Independent)
 Prime Minister – Robert Fico (Smer-SD)
 Speaker of the National Council – Andrej Danko

Events
February — Murder of Ján Kuciak

Sports
9 to 25 February – Slovakia participated at the 2018 Winter Olympics in PyeongChang, South Korea, with 56 competitors in 7 sports

Deaths

5 January – Marián Labuda, actor (b. 1944).

18 March – Michal Horský, political scientist and politician (b. 1943)

6 April – Pavol Paška, politician (b. 1958)

23 April – Vladimír Weiss, footballer (b. 1939)

References

 
2010s in Slovakia
Years of the 21st century in Slovakia
Slovakia
Slovakia